Alvoid Wilson Mays (born July 10, 1966) is a former American football cornerback. He played college football at West Virginia. He was drafted in the eighth round (172nd overall) of the 1989 NFL draft by the Houston Oilers.

He also played for the Washington Redskins for five seasons, helping the team win Super Bowl XXVI, and the Pittsburgh Steelers, as well as the Tampa Bay Storm of the Arena Football League.

Professional career
Mays was selected in the eighth round of the 1989 NFL Draft by the Houston Oilers. He was cut during training camp.

1966 births
Living people
American football cornerbacks
Players of American football from Florida
Pittsburgh Steelers players
Washington Redskins players
West Virginia Mountaineers football players
Tampa Bay Storm players
People from Palmetto, Florida

Alvoid Mays scored his only touchdown on October 1,1995 when he was with the Pittsburgh Steelers. In a game against the San Diego Chargers at Three Rivers Stadium, he intercepted a pass from Chargers Quarterback Stan Humphries & returned it for a touchdown.